Events from the year 1398 in Ireland.

Incumbent
Lord: Richard II

Events
20 July – Roger Mortimer, 4th Earl of March dies at the Battle of Kells in the war against the Leinster Irish.

Births

Deaths

References